

Events 
 Martin Lister, a member of London's Royal Society declares that despite their appearances, fossils were never part of any animals.

References 

17th century in paleontology
Paleontology